Klosters Dorf railway station is a railway station in the village of Klosters, in the Swiss canton of Grisons. It is an intermediate stop on the  gauge Landquart–Davos Platz line of the Rhaetian Railway.

It is the second station in the village but is served less frequently than the adjacent larger Klosters Platz station.

Services
The following services stop at Klosters Dorf:

 RegioExpress:
 Hourly service between Disentis/Mustér and Scuol-Tarasp.
 Regio:
 Limited service to Scuol-Tarasp.
 Limited service between Landquart and Davos Platz.

References

External links
 
 
 

Railway stations in Graubünden
Rhaetian Railway stations
Klosters-Serneus
Railway stations in Switzerland opened in 1889